Ngan Kam-chuen (12 December 1947 – 19 December 2014) was the member of the Legislative Council in 1995–97 for Regional Council. He joined the Provisional Legislative Council existed from 1996 to 98. He was also the Regional Council member from 1989 to 2000.

References

1947 births
2014 deaths
Members of the Provisional Legislative Council
Members of the Regional Council of Hong Kong
Democratic Alliance for the Betterment and Progress of Hong Kong politicians
HK LegCo Members 1995–1997
Members of the Selection Committee of Hong Kong
20th-century Chinese politicians
20th-century Hong Kong people
21st-century Hong Kong people